The 1997 United States elections were off-year elections were held on Tuesday, November 4, 1997, comprising 2 gubernatorial races, 3 congressional special elections, and a plethora of other local elections across the United States. No Senate special elections were held.

Federal elections

United States House of Representatives special elections
In 1997, three special elections were held to fill vacancies to the 105th United States Congress.

State and local elections
Several statewide elections were held this year, most notably the gubernatorial elections in two U.S. States and one U.S. territory.

Gubernatorial elections

Two gubernatorial elections were held in 1997 in New Jersey and the Commonwealth of Virginia in which both seats were held by the Republican Party. Another gubernatorial race was held in the Northern Mariana Islands as well which resulted as a Republican gain.

Note: Candidates' vote percentages are rounded to the nearest tenth of one percent. Candidates earning 0.05% or more of the vote are included.

Mayoral elections

 The Allentown  mayoral election saw the re-election of Republican William L. Heydt  against Democratic Party nominee Martin Velazquez III, a city councilman. 
 In Boston, Democrat Thomas Menino ran unopposed in the election and therefore served his second term as Mayor.
 Houston's officially nonpartisan election resulted in Lee P. Brown, a Democrat, ascend to the Mayor's office two years after leaving U.S. President Bill Clinton's cabinet as Director of National Drug Control Policy.
 The mayoral election in Los Angeles was the most recent election to date in which a Republican, incumbent Richard Riordan, was elected mayoral of the city. He defeated Democratic challenger Tom Hayden on election day.
 The New York City mayoral election saw the re-election of Republican Rudy Giuliani against Democratic Party nominee Ruth Messinger, the Manhattan Borough President.
Elections were also held in Pittsburgh, Buffalo and Peoria, among several other cities in the country.

References

 General
1997
November 1997 events in the United States